Gompholobium oreophilum is a species of flowering plant in the family Fabaceae and is endemic to the north-west of Western Australia. It is an erect shrub with pinnate leaves with elliptic leaflets, and racemes of yellow to orange and creamy-yellow, pea-like flowers.

Description
There are bracts and bracteoles that fall as the flowers open.

Taxonomy
Gompholobium oreophilum was first formally described in 2012 by Carolyn F. Wilkins and Malcolm Eric Trudgen in the journal Nuytsia from specimens collected on Mount Sheila in the Hamersley Range in 2011. The specific epithet (oreophilum) means "mountain-loving", since the species occurs on or near mountains.

Distribution and habitat
This pea grows in open woodland and grassland, mainly in the Hamersley Range but also sometimes in the Chichester Range, in the Pilbara and Gascoyne biogeographic regions of north-western Western Australia.

Conservation status
Gompholobium oreophilum is classified as "not threatened" by the Western Australian Government Department of Parks and Wildlife.

References

oreophilum
Eudicots of Western Australia
Plants described in 2012